Taraneh Alidoosti (born January 12, 1984) is an Iranian actress. She is best known internationally for her role in The Salesman (2016), which won the Best Foreign Language Film Award at the 89th Academy Awards. In a poll conducted among 130 film critics by Sanate Cinema magazine, she was voted the best Iranian movie actress of the decade. In 2012, a similar poll by the Film magazine also chose her as the best actress of the decade.

Career
After having attended the acting school of Amin Tarokh since 2000, she had a leading role in I'm Taraneh, 15 (Rasul Sadr Ameli, 2002). Critics praised her performance as a 15-year-old girl who after a failed relationship is determined to rear a child on her own, while struggling with poverty and disapproval. She won the Bronze Leopard for Best Actress from the Locarno International Film Festival in 2002, as well as the Crystal Simorgh for Best Actress from the 20th Fajr Film Festival, becoming the youngest person ever to do so. Shortly after she set another record, getting nominated three consecutive times for the best actress prize at the Fajr Film Festival for her first three films. Since then she has maintained a steady but selective workflow in both theatre and cinema. She was the lead actress for Ashgar Farhadi's Fireworks Wednesday in 2006, which was also screened at the Locarno Film Festival.

Alidoosti is mostly known for her selectiveness in accepting dramatic roles, as exemplified by her long collaboration with Oscar winner Asghar Farhadi, making her one of the most acclaimed actresses of her generation. She acted as a lead actress in The Salesman which won an Oscar in 2017. A prominent actress in Iran, she has bagged many awards and accolades.Alidoosti played the title role during the three seasons of the hit Iranian VOD series Shahrzad.

Daily Kos has recognized Alidoosti as one of several historically trailblazing women born between 9 through 16 January, along with three other Iranians, Kimia Alizadeh, Christiane Amanpour, and Nadia Maftouni.

Personal life
Alidoosti's father, Hamid, played football for Iran’s national team and was the first Iranian to play for a foreign team (FSV Salmrohr, German 2. Bundesliga). Afterward, he became a professional football coach. Alidoosti's mother, is a sculptor and art tutor.
 
Alidoosti married and in 2013 had a daughter. Her only brother died young in an accident on Fireworks Wednesday, an Iranian New Year festivity.

 Activism and arrest 
 Academy Awards boycott 
On 26 January 2017, Alidoosti announced she would be boycotting the 89th Academy Awards where The Salesman had been nominated for Best Foreign Language Film to protest against upcoming stringent visa travel restrictions that the Trump administration planned to impose on Iranians.

 Arrest 
On 17 December 2022, Iranian authorities detained Alidoosti for making an Instagram post criticising the execution of Mohsen Shekari, which is the first known execution carried out by the Islamic Republic of Iran as a direct result of the Mahsa Amini protests. The Instagram post reads, "Your silence means the support of the oppression and the oppressor. His name was Mohsen Shekari. Every international organization who is watching this bloodshed and not taking action, is a disgrace to humanity."

 Reactions 
About 600 members of the international arts community from 30 different countries signed an open letter demanding Alidoosti's release. Signatories include Olivia Colman, Jessica Chastain, Cillian Murphy, Kristen Stewart, Dame Emma Thompson, Kate Winslet, Marion Cotillard, Isabelle Huppert, Juliette Binoche, Ken Loach, Alfonso Cuarón, Zar Amir Ebrahimi, Golshifteh Farahani, Nazanin Boniadi, Penélope Cruz, Brian Eno, John Oliver, Mark Ruffalo, Ian McKellen,Lily James and Julie Christie.

Robert De Niro released a statement with the Tribeca Festival demanding Alidoosti's immediate release. There have also been statements demanding her release by the Cannes Film Festival, the Berlinale, IFFR, IDFA and the European Film Academy.

 Release 
On 4 January 2023, Alidoosti was released after posting bail, reported to be around £20,000.

Filmography
[[File:Movie news conference The Salesman (12).jpg|300px|thumb|Alidoosti with Asghar Farhadi and Shahab Hosseini at The Salesman's press conference, May 2016]]

Film

 Web 

 Awards and nominations 

See also
Iranian cinema
Detainees of the Mahsa Amini protests

References

External links

 Taraneh Alidoosti at Iranactor.com Taraneh Alidoosti at SourehCinema.com Taraneh Alidoosti at Cinetmag.com''
 
 

1984 births
Actresses from Tehran
Living people
Feminist artists
Iranian feminists
Iranian translators
Iranian film actresses
Iranian stage actresses
Iranian voice actresses
Crystal Simorgh for Best Actress winners